The original Encyclopædia Americana was published in the United States beginning in the late 1820s and continued with new editions and supplements into the 1850s. Other than the name, it had no connection with the Encyclopedia Americana that began publishing in 1902 or the Americanized version of the Encyclopædia Britannica published in the 1880s.

The Encyclopædia Americana. A popular dictionary of arts, sciences, literature, history, politics and biography, brought down to the present time; including a copious collection of original articles in American biography; on the basis of the 7th ed. of the German Conversations-Lexicon was founded by German-born Francis Lieber. It was the first full-size encyclopedia of American authorship, being preceded by Dobson's Encyclopædia (1789–1798), and other American reprints of British encyclopedias, as well as a few compact American encyclopedias such as the four-volume Minor Encyclopedia of 1803, and the seven-volume Low's Encyclopedia, of 1805–1811.

Lieber presented the idea of an American encyclopedia, based on Brockhaus' Conversations-Lexikon, to Carey, Lea & Carey of Philadelphia in January 1828, then the largest publishing house in the United States. Although he invoked the name of the German encyclopedia, he explained that this work would not be simply a translation but be a distinctively American reference work, omitting much of the European matter. The publishers were not at first receptive to the idea, but Lieber had made numerous contacts with American intellectuals who convinced the publishers to commit to the project. Several weeks later they replied with their agreement to the project. "However, instead of being granted a royalty on sets sold, he would be compensated by payments totaling $20,000, and from this sum he must defray editorial costs, such as fees for translators and contributors and salaries of editorial assistants. This may have been a fair enough proposition for the period, but it would leave Lieber in straitened circumstances when the work was done."

Assisted by Edward Wigglesworth, a recent graduate of Harvard University, Lieber set to work. When it was clear they could not keep to their scheduled output of a volume every three months, Thomas Gamaliel Bradford joined the editorial team. The editors offered fifty cents per German page to translators of the Conversations-Lexicon, while contributors of new articles would receive one dollar per page. The later was the rate set by the North American Review. Notable contributors to this edition include: Supreme Court Justice Joseph Story, who provided some twenty articles on legal topics including "Common Law", "Contract", "Corpus delicti", "Courts of England and the United States", "Criminal Law", "Equity", "Evidence", "Jury", "Law", "Natural Law", and "Usury"; Judge John Pickering, who wrote "Agrarian Law", "Americanism", "Indian Languages", and part of "Accents"; and John Davidson Godman, who agreed to contribute articles on natural history, but his work was prematurely ended when he died of tuberculosis in 1830. Also worthy of note was Joseph Bonaparte, the older brother of Napoleon Bonaparte, whose contributions on French topics include a 25,000-word biography on the former emperor of France, which according to De Kay was the longest biographical article in the Encyclopedia Americana.

The first volume was released September 1829, at the price of $2.50, and quickly sold out. When completed in 1833, the first edition comprised 13 volumes. Despite the success of the Encyclopedia, the Panic of 1837 led the Careys to scale back their catalog and concentrate on medical works. Nevertheless, this work continued to return profits to its owners on a regular basis. Publishing houses across the United States, and even in Canada, would rent or purchase Carey stereotype plates and publish Encyclopedia editions with their own imprints at the foot of the title pages, while retaining the Carey copyright notes on the overleaf, through 1858. In 1846, a supplementary fourteenth volume was issued.

In 1848, John Sutter read the encyclopedia's article on "Gold" as part of his efforts to verify the authenticity of the gold found in his mill, a discovery that would start the California Gold Rush.

References

External links 

 Encyclopaedia Americana: A Popular Dictionary of Arts, Sciences, Literature, History, Politics, and Biography based on the German Conversations-Lexicon 7th edition, with American additions; 14 volumes: Boston: B. B. Mussey and Co., 1851

19th-century encyclopedias
American encyclopedias
1829 non-fiction books